The Samsung Galaxy Pocket 2 is a small budget Android smartphone produced by Samsung Electronics and released in September 2014.

Specifications

Hardware
The phone is powered by Spreadtrum SC7715 SoC with 1 GHz ARM Cortex-A7 CPU and ARM Mali 400 GPU. It has 512 MB RAM, 4 GB internal storage and 1200 mAh battery. The device comes with dual SIM card slot; one of the SIM card slots is hybrid, so it can either be used as SIM card slot or microSD card slot. Also, it has a 3.3 inch screen with 240 x 320 pixels resolution and 3G connectivity.

Software
This phone was officially released with Android 4.4.2 KitKat.

See also
 Samsung Galaxy
 Samsung Galaxy J1 Mini (2016)

References

Android (operating system) devices
Samsung mobile phones
Samsung Galaxy
Mobile phones introduced in 2014